Seger is a surname. Notable people with the surname include:

 Adolf Seger (born 1945), German  wrestler
 Bob Seger (born 1945), American rock and roll singer-songwriter and musician
 Caroline Seger (born 1985), Swedish footballer
 Francis Seger (1796–1872), New York politician
 George N. Seger (1866–1940), American politician
 Joe Seger (born 1935), American archaeologist
 John Homer Seger (1846–1928), American educator
 Jon Seger, American evolutionary ecologist
 Josef Seger (1716–1782), Czech organist, composer, and educator
 Linda Seger (born 1945), American author and screenwriting consultant
 Mathias Seger (born 1977), Swiss ice hockey player
 Shea Seger (born 1979), American singer-songwriter

Characters
 Clara Seger, a fictional character on the CBS crime drama Criminal Minds: Beyond Borders, portrayed by Alana de la Garza

See also 

 Seger Ellis (1904–1995), American jazz pianist and vocalist

Related surnames:
 Seeger
 Seager
 Seghers
 Segers
Segger

German-language surnames